This is bibliography of Ethiopian Emperor Haile Selassie I, reigned from 1930 to 1974. The list contains books with year of publication.

List of books 

 The Autobiography of Emperor Haile Sellassie I: King of Kings of All Ethiopia and Lord of All Lords (My Life and Ethiopia's Progress) (My Life... ... (My Life and Ethiopia's Progress) – 1999
 The Wise Mind of Emperor Haile Sellassie I – 2017
 Members Of A New Race: The Teachings Of H.I.M. Haile Sellassie 1 – 2017
 King of Kings: The Triumph and Tragedy of Emperor Haile Selassie I of Ethiopia – 2017
 Holy Bible: Rastafari Edition – 2019
 Selected Speeches of His Imperial Majesty Haile Selassie I – 2011
 Jah Rastafari Prayers: Rasta Prayers & Healing Scriptures – 2016
 Haile Selassie: The Life and Legacy of the Ethiopian Emperor Revered as the Messiah by Rastafarians – 2019
 A Journey to the Roots of Rastafari: The Essene Nazarite Link – 2014
 Books of the Ethiopian Bible: Missing from the Protestant Canon – 2019
 Emancipated From Mental Slavery: Selected Sayings of Marcus Garvey – 2013
 Ethiopia and the Origin of Civilization – 2017
 Prevail: The Inspiring Story of Ethiopia's Victory over Mussolini's Invasion, 1935–1941 – 2017
 Mansa Musa and Timbuktu: The History of the West African Emperor and Medieval Africa’s Most Fabled City – 2019
 The 1619 Project: A New Origin Story Hardcover – 2021
 The Rastafarians: Twentieth Anniversary Edition – 1997
 The Kebra Negast (the Book of the Glory of Kings), with 15 original illustrations (Aziloth Books) – 2013

Music 
 "Haile Selassie" by Teddy Afro (2001)

References 

Haile Selassie
Bibliographies of people